Luvuyo Adam (born 16 December 1992) is a South African cricketer. He made his first-class debut for Eastern Province in the 2016–17 Sunfoil 3-Day Cup on 9 February 2017. He made his List A debut for Eastern Province in the 2016–17 CSA Provincial One-Day Challenge on 12 February 2017.

Adam was the leading wicket-taker in the 2017–18 Sunfoil 3-Day Cup for Eastern Province, with 26 dismissals in ten matches. He made his Twenty20 debut for Knights in the 2018–19 CSA T20 Challenge on 26 April 2019.

References

External links
 

1992 births
Living people
South African cricketers
Knights cricketers
Eastern Province cricketers
Place of birth missing (living people)